The Andrew Young School of Policy Studies at Georgia State University houses the Criminal Justice & Criminology, Economics, School of Social Work, Urban Studies and Public Management & Policy departments. Georgia State University is the largest university in the state of Georgia.

The Andrew Young School enrolls more than 2,100 students each semester. Community internships and job opportunities are a major draw for enrollment, with the school being within walking distance of one of the nation’s largest concentrations of local, state and federal governments and also close to several nonprofit headquarters, such as Care USA and Habitat for Humanity.

History and Culture 

The beginnings of the Andrew Young School were in the establishment of a Master of Governmental Administration degree in 1972. This would later evolve into a Master of Public Administration (M.P.A.) which was offered originally though the Institute of Governmental Administration. After shuffling around throughout the decades, the Georgia State Policy School was established in 1996.

Three years later in 1999, The Policy School was renamed the Andrew Young School of Policy Studies. The name pays respects to  Andrew Young, a civil rights leader from Atlanta who served as United Nations Ambassador from 1977–79, as mayor of Atlanta  from 1982–90, and was instrumental in bringing the Olympics to the city in 1996.

His leadership and Georgia State University's status as one of the most diverse student bodies in the nation allow Andrew Young School's programs to be inclusive and make a global impact. Roughly one-fifth of graduate students come from developing countries, 59 percent of students are women and nearly one-half are African Americans.

Rankings 
U.S. News & World Reports 2020 Best Graduate Schools Public Affairs list ranks the Andrew Young School No. 21 overall: No. 7 in Local Government Management, No. 8 in Public Finance & Budgeting, No. 8 in Urban Policy, No. 9 in Nonprofit Management, No. 19 in Public Management & Leadership, and No. 22 in Public Policy Analysis. Criminology ranks No. 22, Economics ranks No. 59, and the School of Social Work ranks No. 59.

Departments 
Andrew Young School of Policy Studies includes five academic departments:

The Department of Criminal Justice & Criminology
 The Department of Economics
 The Department of Public Management and Policy
 The School of Social Work
The Urban Studies Institute

Degree Programs 
A major pillar of the philosophy of the Andrew Young School is the  belief that economics, public administration and social policy should not be separated. The result is an approach to policy studies that is multidisciplinary, evident in the numerous interdisciplinary degrees offered and partnerships in research with other departments throughout Georgia State University.

Notably, a Bachelor of Interdisciplinary Studies in Philosophy, Politics, and Economics was established in Fall of 2017, based on a deep historical connection of the disciplines and using analytically rigorous tools to prepare students for careers in law, economics, and business. The Andrew Young School also offers a Bachelor of Business Administration degree in Economics is offered in partnership with the J. Mack Robinson College of Business, and various other interdisciplinary undergraduate and graduate degrees.

Undergraduate Degree Programs 

Bachelor of Arts (B.A.) in Economics
Bachelor of Science (B.S.) in Economics
Bachelor of Business Administration (B.B.A.) in Economics 
Bachelor of Interdisciplinary Studies (B.I.S.) in Philosophy, Politics, and Economics
Bachelor of Science (B.S.) in Criminal Justice
Bachelor of Arts (B.A.) in International Economics & Modern Languages
Bachelor of Interdisciplinary Studies (B.I.S.) in Social Entrepreneurship 
Bachelor of Science (B.S.) in Public Policy
Bachelor of Arts (B.A.) in Social Work

Graduate Degree Programs 

Master of Arts (M.A.) in Economics
Master of Arts (M.A.) in Economics - Public Policy Track
Master of Public Administration (M.P.A.)
Master of Public Administration (M.P.A.) / Juris Doctor (J.D.)
Master of Public Policy (M.P.P.) in Policy Studies
Master of Social Work (M.S.W.) in Social Work
Master of Science (M.S.) in Criminal Justice
Master of Interdisciplinary Studies (M.I.S.) in Criminal Justice Administration
Master of Interdisciplinary Studies (M.I.S.) in Urban Studies
Peace Corps Masters International Program

Doctoral Degree Programs 

Doctor of Philosophy (Ph.D.) in Criminal Justice and Criminology
Doctor of Philosophy (Ph.D.) in Economics
Doctor of Philosophy (Ph.D.) in Public Policy with the Georgia Institute of Technology
Doctor of Philosophy (Ph.D.) in Public Policy
Doctor of Philosophy (Ph.D.) in Urban Studies

Graduate Certificate programs 

 Nonprofit Management
 Planning and Economic Development

Research Centers and Programs 

The Andrew Young School has an international presence in its research efforts with more than 135 faculty having worked in more than 70 countries worldwide. This translates to more than 230 scholarly papers, journal articles, chapters and books published annually and more than $26 million in active sponsored grants in the 2019 fiscal year.  The school runs ten research centers and conducts numerous research collaborations within Georgia State University, born of the Andrew Young School's interdisciplinary approach to research and education.

Research Centers 
 Public Finance Research Group
Center for State and Local Finance
Fiscal Research Center
International Center for Public Policy
 Evidence-based Cybersecurity Research Center
 Experimental Economics Center (ExCEN)
 Georgia Health Policy Center
 Georgia International Law Enforcement Exchange
 Georgia Policy Labs
MAPLE (Metro Atlanta Policy Lab for Education)
Child & Family Policy Lab
CTEx (Career and Technical Education Policy Exchange)
 Nonprofit Studies Program
 Usery Workplace Research Group

Interdisciplinary Research Collaborations 

 Second Century Initiative with College of Education and Human Development 
 Future of Cities Research Institute with School of Public Health
 Global Research Against Non-Commutable Disease (GRAND) Initiative with School of Public Health and College of Arts and Sciences
 Cyber Security and Public Policy with Robinson College of Business and College of Arts and Sciences
 The Center for the Quantitative and Statistical Sciences (QUEST) with School of Public Health, College of Education and Human Development, College of Arts and Sciences, Robinson College of Business, Lewis College of Nursing and Health Professions, Institute for Biomedical Sciences, Global Studies Institute
 Intimate Partner Violence Initiative with Department of Psychology and School of Public Health 
 Population Health and Precision Medicine with Institute for Biomedical Science, the Department of Biology, the School of Public Health and the College of Law’s Center for Law, Health and Society

The Facility 

The current home of the Andrew Young School of Policy Studies has a varied past, as the building dates to 1905. The Fourth National Bank opened the building on the southwest corner of Marietta and Peachtree streets in 1905 - the site of the Norcross Building which had burned in a 1902 fire – and was for one year the tallest building in the city until the Candler Building was built. Morgan & Dillon designed the building.

In 1928 firm Pringle & Smith directed addition of several floors to the building, an extension northward along Marietta street resulting in an L-shaped building, and a renovation of the interior to an even more opulent style.

In 1966, First National Bank built a 41-story tower on the lot adjacent to the south, site of the Peachtree Arcade (1917-1964); today the State of Georgia Building; the architect was Cecil Alexander. It removed the top half of the original building and resurfaced it in the white marble that covers it today.

References

External links

Georgia State University
Pringle and Smith buildings